Coleophora microtitae is a moth of the family Coleophoridae. It is found in Afghanistan.

The larvae feed on Artemisia badhysi. They feed on the leaves of their host plant.

References

microtitae
Moths described in 1967
Moths of Asia